Harold Montelle Stephens (March 6, 1886 – May 28, 1955) was a United States circuit judge of the United States Court of Appeals for the District of Columbia Circuit.

Education and career

Born in Crete, Nebraska, Stephens attended the University of California, Berkeley and received an Artium Baccalaureus degree from Cornell University in 1909. In 1913, he received a Bachelor of Laws from Harvard Law School, from which he would go on to receive a Doctor of Juridical Science in 1932. He entered private practice in Salt Lake City, Utah in 1912. He worked as a prosecutor in Salt Lake County, Utah from 1915 until 1917, when he was appointed to a seat on the Third Judicial District Court of Utah. He returned to his private practice in 1921, relocating to Los Angeles, California in 1928. In 1933, he moved to Washington, D.C. to become the first Assistant Attorney General in charge of the newly established Antitrust Division of the United States Department of Justice. He was Assistant to the Attorney General of the United States in 1935.

Federal judicial service

Stephens was nominated by President Franklin D. Roosevelt on July 23, 1935, to an Associate Justice seat on the United States Court of Appeals for the District of Columbia (Judge of the United States Court of Appeals for the District of Columbia Circuit from June 25, 1948) vacated by Associate Justice William Hitz. He was confirmed by the United States Senate on July 24, 1935, and received his commission on July 27, 1935. Following the death of Justice Cardozo in 1938, Stephens was considered by President Roosevelt as a possible replacement, although the seat ultimately went to Felix Frankfurter. His service terminated on March 9, 1948, due to appointment as Chief Justice of the same court.

Stephens was nominated by President Harry S. Truman on February 2, 1948, to the Chief Justice seat on the United States Court of Appeals for the District of Columbia vacated by Judge Duncan Lawrence Groner. He was confirmed by the Senate on March 2, 1948, and received his commission on March 5, 1948. Stephens was reassigned by operation of law to the newly renamed United States Court of Appeals for the District of Columbia Circuit on September 1, 1948, to a new Judge seat authorized by 62 Stat. 869. He served as Chief Judge and as a member of the Judicial Conference of the United States from 1948 to 1955. His service terminated on May 28, 1955, due to his death.

References

Sources
 Daniel R. Ernst, "State, Party, and Harold M. Stephens: The Utahn Origins of an Anti-New Dealer."  Western Legal History 14 (Summer/Fall 2001): 123-57
 Daniel R. Ernst, "Dicey's Disciple on the D.C. Circuit: Judge Harold Stephens and Administrative Law Reform, 1933-1940."  Georgetown Law Journal 90 (2002): 787-812
 

1886 births
1955 deaths
People from Crete, Nebraska
Cornell University alumni
Judges of the United States Court of Appeals for the D.C. Circuit
United States court of appeals judges appointed by Franklin D. Roosevelt
20th-century American judges
United States court of appeals judges appointed by Harry S. Truman
Utah state court judges
Harvard Law School alumni